Lincoln Avenue may refer to:
Lincoln Avenue (Chicago), an avenue in Chicago, Illinois, USA
Lincoln Avenue (Pasadena), an avenue in Pasadena and Altadena, California, USA
Lincoln Avenue, an avenue in Lockport, New York, USA
Lincoln Avenue, an avenue in Mount Vernon, New York, USA, which crosses New York State Route 22
Lincoln Avenue, an avenue in Staten Island, New York, USA
Lincoln Avenue (Orange County), an avenue in the cities of Anaheim, Orange, Buena Park, and Cypress, California. The portion between Euclid Street in Anaheim and Bloomfield Avenue in Cypress was originally part of SR 214, but this portion was eventually relinquished to local jurisdictions.